Amai Manabilang, officially the Municipality of Amai Manabilang (Maranao: Inged a Amai Manabilang), is a 3rd class municipality in the province of Lanao del Sur, Philippines. According to the 2020 census, it has a population of 12,124 people.

The municipality, formerly Bumbaran, was changed to Amai Manabilang under Muslim Mindanao Act No. 316 on January 22, 2015.

Etymology
Bumbaran is named after the legendary city of Magalinday Bembaran in the Darangen, a Meranau (Maranao) epic. The scenic beauty of the town resembles the beauty of Magalinday Bembaran.

After the political efforts of Mayor James Manabilang, Bumbaran was renamed into Amai Manabilang, in honor of his own personal ancestor.

History
Bumbaran was commonly known before as “Aparport” its seat of government. Its existence came into being when President Ferdinand E. Marcos signed into law on November 17, 1977, Presidential Decree No. 1243 creating Aparport a separate and independent municipality and naming it the Municipality of Bumbaran, separate from the Municipality of Wao, its mother municipality. This was necessary in order to maximize the enforcement of law and order and expedite optimum and sustainable development.

At that time, the municipality consisted of 21 barangays namely: Sumogot, Francfort, Lambanogan, Punud, Comara, Aparport, Paglamatan, Natangcopan, Mansilano, Salam, Bandara-Ingud, Ranao-Ibaning, Bagumbayan, Pagonayan, Piagma, Lico, Siuan, Lama, Borntacan, Miorod, and Someorang. It was reduced to seventeen barangays when President Corazon C. Aquino signed an Executive Order in December 1986 abolishing thousands of barangays in the country which affected barangays Lama, Miorod, Borontacan, and Someorang.

History of Barangay Francfort

The Municipality of Amai Manabilang is composed of two major groups – 99% Muslim Bangsamoro and 1% Catholic. Catholics inhabited barangays Sumogot and Francfort. The Muslim Bangsamoros occupied the rest of the 17 barangays. Due to the aftereffect of the Settler Program, in spite of Meranau protestations dividing their once united province, on the excuse of geographical and cultural reasons, the Sangguniang Bayan, thru Resolution designated Barangay Francfort as Poblacion (Center) for Catholic populace and Barangay Natangcopan as poblacion for the Muslim Bangsamoros. Barangay Natangcopan is an extension of Barangay Aparport, the original seat of government.

Barangay Francfort, together with barangays Sumogot, Aparport and Mansilano were regular barangays of Wao before Bumbaran was created a municipality.

Francfort is named after Mr. Franco and Mr. Fortich, the organizers of the National Reconstruction and Rehabilitation Administrator (NARRA) Settlements Project in the Municipality of Wao. It was created as a regular barangay of Wao in 1965. The first settlers of these barangays were the Ilocanos and Ivatans, followed from 1967 by the Ilongos, Visaya, Kapampangan and other smaller Catholic converted ethnic groups. As anticipated through the Settlements pushing the indigenous away from their land and opportunities, peace and order in the area was interrupted by the Catholic militia ILAGA and the response of the Moro Blackshirts from 1972 to 1976 which caused the evacuation of some residents and damage to properties including the burning of houses.

By November 17, 1977, the Municipality of Bumbaran was created into a separate municipality by virtue of Presidential Decree No. 1234 signed by then President Ferdinand Edralin Marcos, and barangay Francfort was included as one of its regular barangays. Consequently, in the mid1980s, the people returned little by little.

Before Bumbaran was created as a separate municipality, Hadji Acob was the Barangay Chairman of Barangay Francfort; on his death, Efren Vaso succeeded him. In the following barangay election, Columbus Kalaw was elected Barangay Chairman until he was defeated by Wilfredo Barcelona. In 1993, Oscar Baldonasa was elected chairman and he was re-elected in the 1996 and 2002 barangay elections.

Barangay Francfort is bounded on the East by Maridugao/Maridgaw River; West by Barangay Sumogot; On the south Sumogot river; and on the North by Barangay Lambanogan.

Mountain ranges, hills, plateaus, and flatland characterize the topography of the barangay. It has a vast agricultural land suited for crops like rice, corn, carrots, sugar cane. Its hydrological features comprise rivers like the Maridugao and Sumogot, streams, swamps, creeks and springs.

Barangay Francfort has a total land area of 1,304 hectares. The soil is loam and the climate is temperate. The population is 1,491 according to the 2000 Census, with 298 households.

Geography
East Sumogot on the Lanao–Bukidnon boundary as point 3; then by straight line following the Lumba - a Bayabao–Wao boundary line. Southward of the intersection of the Lana–Cotabato boundary as point 4; then finally 1.72 km. Eastward following the Lanao–Cotabato boundary to the starting point.

Barangays
Amai Manabilang is politically subdivided into 17 barangays.

 Bagumbayan
 Bandara-Ingud
 Comara (Potre Maamor)
 Francfort
 Lambanogan
 Lico
 Mansilano
 Natangcopan
 Pagalamatan
 Pagonayan
 Penud
 Piagma
 Poblacion (Apartfort)
 Ranao-Baning
 Salam
 Sigu-an
 SumOGOT

Climate

The town's climate is similar to that of Baguio.

Demographics

Ethic groups
The Municipality of Amai Manabilang is inhabited by settlers of different origins, like Ilonggos, Ivatans, Ilocano, Bisaya and other smaller ethnic groups that dominated barangays Francfort and Sumugot. This is due to the Settlement Program and Land Tenure Laws of the Republic of the Philippines. The Moro Maranaws who came from the different municipalities of Lanao del Sur and Lanao del Norte inhabited the rest of the seventeen barangays of this municipality. Their source of livelihood is farming, mainly crop production. Having rich soil, the municipality is one of the largest corn producers in the province, only second to its mother municipality of Wao for having vast agricultural land capable of producing variable crops which could give sufficient food and income to the population.

Economy

References

External links
Amai Manabilang Profile at the DTI Cities and Municipalities Competitive Index
[ Philippine Standard Geographic Code]
Philippine Census Information
Local Governance Performance Management System

Municipalities of Lanao del Sur
Establishments by Philippine presidential decree